Haye Bari is a town in the Misraq Gashamo woreda, in the Somali Region of Ethiopia. It is mainly populated by the Reer Daahir sub-division of the Habr Je'lo Isaaq.

References 

Populated places in the Somali Region